The Abdus Salam Award (sometimes called the Salam Prize), is a most prestigious award that is awarded annually to Pakistani nationals to the field of chemistry, mathematics, physics, biology. The award is awarded to the scientists who are resident in Pakistan, below 35 years of age on 31 December of the year for which the Prize was to be awarded. It is to consist of a certificate giving a citation and a cash award of US$1,000. It is to be awarded on the basis of the collected research and/or a technical essay written specially for the Prize

The Award is a brainchild of Professor Abdus Salam's students Dr. Riazuddin, Dr. Fayyazuddin and Dr. Asghar Qadir who first presented the idea to Abdus Salam in 1979. Abdus Salam, who felt that he had no right to use the Prize money for personal purposes but that it must be used to further his mission of development of Science in the Third World. Abdus Salam specially put aside money to help Pakistan and Pakistani students. In 1980, Prof. Salam asked Prof. Fayyazuddin and Dr. Asghar Qadir to formulate the rules and procedures for a Prize to be awarded to young Pakistani scientists for their research in the basic sciences. Professor Asghar Qadir is currently the Secretary of Salam Prize Committee at School of Natural Sciences (SNS) in National University of Sciences and Technology (NUST).

Recipients

1981: Dr. Nazma Ikram (Maiden name: Dr. Nazma Masud) – (Physics)
No award was given by Abdus Salam in 1982. According to him none of the nominations came close to the 1981 award winner Dr. Nazma Ikram.
1984: Dr. Pervaiz Amirali Hoodbhoy – (Mathematics)
1985: Dr. Mujahid Kamran - (Physics)
1985: Dr. Mujaddid Ahmed Ijaz – (Physics)
1986: Dr. Muhammad Suhail Zubairy – (Physics)
1986: Dr. Bina S. Siddiqui – (Chemistry)
1987: Dr. Qaiser Mushtaq – (Mathematics)
1990: Dr. M. Iqbal Choudhry– (Chemistry)
1991: Dr. Ashfaque H. Bokhari – (Mathematics)
1994: Dr. Anwar-ul Hassan Gilani – (Biology)
1997: Dr. Asghar Qadir - (Mathematics)
1998: Dr. Naseer Shahzad – (Mathematics)
1999: Dr. Tasawar Hayat – (Mathematics)
2000: Dr. Rabia Hussain – (Biology)
2001: Dr. Farhan Saif – (Physics)
2002: Dr. Muhammad Arif Malik - (Chemistry)
2003: Dr. Ghulam Shabbir - (Mathematics)
2009: Dr. Naseer-Ud-Din Shams – (Physics)
2009: Dr. Tayyab Kamran – (Mathematics)
2010: Dr. Muhammad Tahir - (Biology)
2012: Dr. Amer Iqbal — (Physics)
2012: Dr. Hafiz Zia-ur-Rehman - (Chemistry), Department of Chemistry, Quaid-i-Azam University, Islamabad.
2013: Dr. Rahim Umar - (Mathematics), Faculty of Engineering Sciences, Ghulam Ishaq Khan Institute of Engineering Sciences and Technology.

See also

 List of biology awards
 List of chemistry awards
 List of mathematics awards
 List of physics awards

Resources

Physics awards
Mathematics awards
Chemistry awards
Biology awards
Pakistani science and technology awards
Civil awards and decorations of Pakistan
Awards established in 1980
Abdus Salam